WLBJ-LP (104.1 FM) was a low-power non-commercial radio station licensed to Fostoria, Ohio. Owned by the members of the Knights of Columbus Council #1197 d/b/a the Christopher Center Corporation, it carried a Catholic–based Christian format as a repeater of the Toledo-based Annunciation Radio network.

A construction permit was granted by the Federal Communications Commission (FCC) on November 12, 2014. The FCC canceled the station's license on October 2, 2020, for failing to file a license renewal application.

In March of 2022, Holy Family Radio (an EWTN affiliate based at WJTA Glandorf/Leipsic) announced it has filed an application for a construction permit for 90.9 FM as a WJTA simulcast.

External links
WLBJ webpage from Annunciation Radio website

LBJ-LP
Fostoria, Ohio
LBJ-LP
Radio stations disestablished in 2020 
Defunct radio stations in the United States 
Defunct religious radio stations in the United States 
LBJ-LP